Excoecaria holophylla is a species of flowering plant in the family Euphorbiaceae. It was described in 1874. It is native to Myanmar.

References

holophylla
Plants described in 1874
Flora of Myanmar